Franka Bernadine is a politician from the island of Grenada.  She served as  Grenada's Minister of Education and Human Resources. From 3 November 2019 until 31 October 2021 she was the Leader of the National Democratic Congress (Grenada).

References

External links

Ministry webpage

Year of birth missing (living people)
Living people
Members of the Senate of Grenada
Grenadian people of Indian descent
Grenadian Roman Catholics
Government ministers of Grenada
National Democratic Congress (Grenada) politicians
Place of birth missing (living people)
21st-century women politicians
Women government ministers of Grenada
21st-century Grenadian politicians